Kantrila (Urdu) is a village of Jhelum District in the Punjab Province of Pakistan.

References

Populated places in Jhelum District